The Rest Is History is Jin's debut album. It was released on October 19, 2004.

Background
Originally titled Almost Famous, the album was delayed for over a year. Originally slated for a Summer 2003 release it was pushed back to an October 2003 date. After plans did not materialize due to disputes with Virgin Records, the album's release date was pushed back once more to March 23, 2004. However, the release date got pushed back twice more, to August 24, 2004, until it finally arrived, with a completely new title, on October 19, 2004.

During the year-long delay, Jin released the two mixtapes called History in the Making and Definition of History. After the album was released Jin released the last in the History mixtape series Lost History.

A promotional track, Chinatown featuring fellow Chinese-American rapper L.S. was thought to be the first single. The first official single, "Learn Chinese", came out in late 2003. "Get Your Handz Off ", another promotional single (second overall) was released online and impacted radio on June 29, 2004. The second single for the album was slated to be "I Got A Love", but Roc-A-Fella Records blocked the decision, fearing too many singles would over-expose Kanye West.

Kanye West included an extra verse in "I Got a Love (Remix)", which was later used in his song "I Wonder" on his album, Graduation. Due to the decision of the executives at Roc-A-Fella,"Señorita" and "So Afraid" were the second and third singles respectively, both released on August 31, 2004.

Promotional singles
 Chinatown was released on the first and only promo single. It was rumored to be the first single from the album. It features Jin's close friend and fellow Chinese American rapper, L.S.

Miscellaneous
 The tracks "A Little Hungry" and "Check the Clock" were omitted from the North American release.
 There is an alternate version of "Thank You", however, it did not make the final cut, but was used in his later mixtape I Quit.
 "C'Mon" contains a sample from Eminem's song, "Sing For The Moment", which in turn samples the Aerosmith song, Dream On.

Reception
The album had favorable to mixed reviews. Allmusic.com has stated "The Rest Is History showcases Jin's talents at length, but its stilted moments are as plentiful as its impressive ones, if not more so, perhaps explaining why it took the album a year to see the light of day." RapReviews.com has stated "Thankfully, these tracks are exceptions as opposed to the rule, so The Rest is History works quite well as a whole. Above all else Jin has proved that his Freestyle Friday victories and his signing to Ruff Ryders was not a joke - and if anything is the best thing to happen to that crew in a long time. So what ultimately is history here? All of the haters who are swinging on Jin's nuts."

Chart performance
The album debuted at the #54 on the Billboard 200 selling 20,000 copies in its first week and spent 3 weeks on the charts, peaking at #54. The album also spent 7 weeks on the Billboard Top R&B/Hip-Hop Albums debuting at #12. It also spent two weeks at the Billboard Top Rap Albums debuting at #8. The album to date has sold  over 100,000 units in the United States and over 250,000 worldwide.

Track listing

Samples & Interpolations

"Get Your Handz Off" 
contains a sample from "Children Of The Sun" by Mandrill
"I Got a Love"  
contains a sample from Lenny Williams's "Cause I Love You"
"Learn Chinese"
contains samples from James Brown's "Blind Man Can See It"
contains elements of Yellowman's "Mr. Chin"
contains added vocals by Ayeesha. 
"Senorita"  
contains replayed elements from the composition "Give Up Your Guns" written by Gerald Florio and Rupert Holmes
"Love Story"
contains interpolation from "Groove With You" by Isley Brothers
"C'mon"
contains a sample from Eminem's song, "Sing For The Moment", which in turn samples the Aerosmith song, Dream On

Album chart positions

External links
 The Rest is History Official website

MC Jin albums
2004 debut albums
Albums produced by Swizz Beatz
Albums produced by Kanye West
Albums produced by Just Blaze
Albums produced by Bink (record producer)
Ruff Ryders Entertainment albums
Albums produced by Jerry Duplessis
Albums produced by Neo da Matrix